William Carey Poland (1846–1929) was an American classical scholar, educator, academic administrator, and former university president. He was Professor Emeritus at Brown University starting in 1915; and the President of Rhode Island School of Design from 1896 to 1907.

Biography 
William Carey Poland was born on January 25, 1846, in Goffstown, New Hampshire. His father was Baptist minister James Willey Poland. Poland attended Brown University, where he received an A.B. degree and an M.A. degree in 1868.  

He served as the director of the American School of Classical Studies at Athens in 1891. He taught Greek and Latin at Brown University from 1870 to 1890 and taught art history from 1892 to 1915. In 1878, he worked as a private tutor for John Carter Brown's two sons to prepare them for college. Brown's sons John and Harold traveled with Poland to Berlin, Paris, and Cannes to study classics. When he retired in 1915, he was made Professor Emeritus of Art History. 

He was the fifth president of the Rhode Island School of Design (RISD), serving from 1896 to 1907. During his time at RISD, the school acquired Memorial Hall on Benefit Street (in 1903), marking the school's physical expansion beyond a single building.

Poland was married to Clara (née Harkness), daughter of Albert Harkness, and together they had three sons.

References 

1846 births
1929 deaths
People from Goffstown, New Hampshire
Brown University alumni
Brown University faculty
Presidents of the Rhode Island School of Design
People from Providence, Rhode Island
American School of Classical Studies at Athens
American classical scholars
Classical scholars of Brown University
Burials at Swan Point Cemetery